Solo Recordings at Home is the fourth studio album by American singer-songwriter and musician Michael Gira. It was released in 2001 through Gira's own record label, Young God Records. The album features Gira's home recordings.

The unreleased track from the home recording sessions were included in the album The Milk of M. Gira: Selected Solo Home Recordings 2001-2010, released in 2011.

Background and music
Solo Recordings at Home is primarily an acoustic album, "placing the emphasis on Gira's voice and guitar only, captured at home via one microphone." Nevertheless, the track "Irish Queen" was roughly recorded during a concert and the fully orchestrated track "God's Servant" was taken directly from the Angels of Light's New Mother (1999). The album also features reworkings of two Swans tracks, "I Remember Who You Are" and "Love Will Save You," from The Burning World (1989) and White Light From the Mouth of Infinity (1991), respectively.

The songs on the album feature lyrics on various topics. The track "Kosinsky" was described as "a fascinating contrast to the lyrical meditation on voyeurism" while the tracks "Surrogate" and "On the Mountain" were described to be "among his bluntest ever."

Critical reception

Allmusic critic Ned Raggett wrote: "In keeping with his post-Swans work, though, Gira's singing balances command with empathy, cracked and tender at once; anyone not taken with his late-'90s singing won't be convinced here, though fans will find it addictive." Raggett further wrote: "His guitar playing similarly can shift on a dime from sudden, brusque runs to gentler, steady fingerpicking, evoking everything from strung out rural blues to Nick Drake's hushed emptiness while still sounding uniquely in his own style."

Track listing
All songs written by  Michael Gira.
 "What You Were" – 5:36
 "All Souls' Rising" – 5:55
 "Love Will Save You" – 4:46
 "Surrogate" – 5:45
 "Kosinsky" – 4:47
 "On The Mountain" – 6:31
 "Waiting Beside Viragio" – 2:19
 "Someone Like Me" – 4:47
 "I Remember Who You Are" – 4:57
 "Mosquito Coast" – 5:11
 "Irish Queen" – 4:41
 "God's Servant" – 4:48
 "Mary Found John" – 1:13

Personnel
 Michael Gira – vocals, guitar, recording, artwork

References

External links
 

2001 albums
Michael Gira albums
Young God Records albums
Albums produced by Michael Gira